This list of ports in Finland includes the largest cargo and passenger sea ports in Finland by international transport volumes. It excludes individual harbours (such as Vuosaari Harbour, part of the Port of Helsinki), military bases, marinas and inland waterway ports (such as the Port of Lappeenranta).

Sources

Finland
Ports and harbours of Finland
Water transport in Finland
Buildings and structures in Finland